Kheyrabad-e Mayagh may refer to:
 Kheyrabad-e Mayagh, Kharameh
 Kheyrabad-e Mayagh, Shiraz